Enrique Chimento  is an Argentinian football defender who played for Argentina in the 1934 FIFA World Cup. He also played for Barracas Central.

References

External links
FIFA profile

Argentine footballers
Argentine people of Italian descent
Argentina international footballers
Association football defenders
1934 FIFA World Cup players
Year of birth missing
Year of death missing